Nariman is a rural locality (a settlement) in Svetloyarsky District, Volgograd Oblast, Russia. The population was 1,426 as of 2010. There are 32 streets.

Geography 
Nariman is located 57 km west of Svetly Yar (the district's administrative centre) by road. Zarya is the nearest rural locality.

References 

Rural localities in Svetloyarsky District